The Yogi and the Commissar (1945) is a collection of essays of Arthur Koestler, divided in three parts: Meanderings, Exhortations and Explorations. In the first two parts he has collected essays written from 1942 to 1945 and the third part was written especially for this book.

In the title essay, Koestler proposes a continuum of philosophies for achieving "heaven on earth", from the Commissar at the materialist, scientific end of the spectrum, to the Yogi at the spiritual, metaphysical end. The Commissar wants to change society using any means necessary, while the Yogi wants to change the individual, with an emphasis on ethical purity instead of on results.

Using a metaphor of spectra of radiation, Koestler figures the Commissar at the infra-red end of the spectrum; the Yogi is ultra-violet.  Neither are in the realm of visible light, he suggests, and just so the full dynamics of history and culture escape us.  

One essay, “The Birth of a Myth” published in Horizon, April 1943, appeared as “In Memory of Richard Hillary” in a longer version, pp46–67.

References

1945 essays
1945 non-fiction books
Jonathan Cape books
Essay collections